Tobías Joel Zárate (born 7 July 2000) is an Argentine-born Chilean professional footballer who plays as a centre-forward for Deportivo Morón, on loan from Vélez Sarsfield.

Career
Zárate joined the youth system of Vélez Sarsfield at the age of seven. He scored over fifty goals for their academy. Zárate was promoted to their first-team squad for the start of 2020 under manager Gabriel Heinze, initially appearing as an unused substitute for Primera División matches with Gimnasia y Esgrima and Aldosivi towards the end of January. He made his senior debut on 4 February during a Copa Sudamericana first stage first leg encounter with Ecuador's Aucas, after replacing Lucas Robertone with eighteen minutes left. Zárate again featured off the bench in the second leg two weeks later.

On 5 October 2020, Zárate was announced as a loan signing by Primeira Liga side Famalicão; initially penning terms until December 2021, having also extended his Vélez contract until June 2023. He would only feature for the Portuguese club's U23s in Liga Revelação. He made his reserve debut on 12 November against Leixões, before scoring twice in a 2–2 draw away to Académica on 5 December; his last league appearance came on 15 January 2021 versus Belenenses SAD. Zárate returned to Vélez Sarsfield in February, before departing on loan to Primera Nacional with Deportivo Morón on 11 March.

After a short term loaned at Coquimbo Unido in the Chilean Primera División, he returned to Deportivo Morón in June 2022.

In 2023, he joined Arsenal de Sarandí on loan until December.

Personal life
Zárate is the son of former footballer Rolando Zárate. He is also the nephew of footballers Mauro, Sergio and Ariel.

From his paternal line, he is of Chilean descent due to the fact that his grandfather, Juvenal, was born in Chuquicamata, Chile.

Career statistics
.

Notes

References

External links

2000 births
Living people
People from Morón Partido
Argentine sportspeople of Chilean descent
Argentine people of Calabrian descent
Argentine footballers
Association football forwards
Argentine expatriate footballers
Argentine Primera División players
Primeira Liga players
Primera Nacional players
Chilean Primera División players
Club Atlético Vélez Sarsfield footballers
F.C. Famalicão players
Deportivo Morón footballers
Coquimbo Unido footballers
Arsenal de Sarandí footballers
Expatriate footballers in Chile
Argentine expatriate sportspeople in Chile
Expatriate footballers in Portugal
Argentine expatriate sportspeople in Portugal
Zárate family
Sportspeople from Buenos Aires Province